The 2018–19 Men's Volleyball Thailand League is the 14th season of the Men's Volleyball Thailand League, the top Thai professional league for men's volleyball clubs. Eight teams competed in the league. The season started on 27 October 2018.

Nakhon Ratchasima The Mall are the defending champions, also the reigning asian club champions, while the 2018 Pro Challenge champion will has entered as the promoted team from the 2018 Volleyball Pro Challenge.

Changes from last season

Team changes

Promoted clubs
Promoted from the 2018 Women's Volleyball Pro Challenge
 Diamond Food Saraburi (2018 Pro Challenge champion)
 Khonkaen (2018 Pro Challenge runner-up)

Relegated clubs
Relegated from the 2017–18 Women's Volleyball Thailand League
 Kasetsart
 Khonkaen

Reformed club
 Cosmo Chiang Rai authorize from NK Fitness Samutsakorn

Clubs

Personnel and kits

National team players
Note :: players who released during second leg transfer window;: players who registered during second leg transfer window;→: players who left club after registered during first or second leg.

National team player quotas except from regulation
Amorntep Konhan is first time in national team with RMUTL Phitsanulok.
Jakraprop Saengsee is first time in national team with Air Force.
Mawin Maneewong is first time in national team with Air Force.
Anuchit Pakdeekaew is first time in national team with Air Force.
Kantapat Koonmee is first time in national team with Air Force.
Chatmongkhon Paketkaew is first time in national team with Diamond Food Saraburi .
Academic players will not including in national team player quota.

Foreign players

Note :: players who released during second leg transfer window;: players who registered during second leg transfer window;→: players who left club after registered during first or second leg.

Format

Regular season
First leg: single round-robin.
Second leg: single round-robin.

Regular season standing procedure
 Number of matches won
 Match points
 Sets ratio
 Points ratio
 Result of the last match between the tied teams

Match won 3–0 or 3–1: 3 match points for the winner, 0 match points for the loser
Match won 3–2: 2 match points for the winner, 1 match point for the loser

Finals series

Venues

Note
 Keelawes 1 Gymnasium is initiatively proposed venue in Week 4 (17 to 18 November 2018), but TVA moved venue to Mcc Hall The Mall Bangkapi.
 Chonburi Municipal Gymnasium is initiatively proposed venue in Week 5 (1 to 2 December 2018), but TVA moved venue to Mcc Hall The Mall Bangkapi.
 Khon Kaen Provincial Gymnasium is initiatively proposed venue in Week 6 and 7 (15 to 16 and 22 to 23 December 2018), but TVA moved venue to Khonkaen International Convention and Exhibition Center.

Regular season

League table

Head-to-Head results

Positions by round

Results

First leg
All times are Indochina Time (UTC+07:00).

Week 1 – Chonburi

|}

Week 2 – Nakhon Ratchasima

|}

Week 3 – Bangkok

|}

Week 4 – Bangkok

|}

Week 5 – Bangkok

|}

Week 6 – Khon Kaen

|}

Week 7 – Khon Kaen

|}

Second leg
All times are Indochina Time (UTC+07:00).

Week 8 – Khon Kaen

|}

Week 9 – Nonthaburi

|}

Week 10 – Nonthaburi

|}

Week 11 – Nakhon Ratchasima

}

|}

Week 12 – Nakhon Ratchasima

|}

Week 13 – Bangkok

|}

Week 14 – Bangkok

|}

Finals series
All times are Indochina Time (UTC+07:00).

Final Team

Venue
The final series matches are played at the MCC Hall The Mall Bang Kapi in Bangkok.

Semi-finals

|}

3rd place 

|}

Final 

|}

Final standing

Awards

Most Valuable Player
  Kantapat Koonmee (Air Force)

Best Scorer
  Amorntep Konhan (RMUTL Phitsanulok)

Best Outside Spiker
  Kantapat Koonmee (Air Force)
  Douglas Bueno (Nakhon Ratchasima The Mall)

Best Servers
  Liu Hong-Min (Diamond Food Saraburi)

Best Middle Blocker
  Liu Hong-Jie (Diamond Food Saraburi)
  Anuchit Pakdeekaew (Air Force)

Best Setter
  Saranchit Charoensuk (Nakhon Ratchasima The Mall)

Best Opposite Spiker
  Amorntep Konhan (Nakhon Ratchasima)

Best Libero
  Jakkapong Tongklang (Visakha)

Statistics leader

The statistics of each group follows the vis reports P2 and P5. The statistics include 6 volleyball skills; serve, reception, set, spike, block, and dig. The table below shows the top 5 ranked players in each skill plus top scorers at the completion of the tournament.

Regular season
After Leg 2 Week 1

Best Scorers

Best Spikers

Best Blockers

Best Servers

Best Diggers

Best Setters

Best Receivers

See also
 2018–19 Women's Volleyball Thailand League
 2018 Men's Volleyball Kor Royal Cup
 2018 Men's Volleyball Pro Challenge
 2018 Women's Volleyball Kor Royal Cup
 2018 Women's Volleyball Pro Challenge

References

Thailand League
Thailand League
2018